Ignas Dedura (born 6 January 1978) is a Lithuanian former football player.

Club career
Dedura began his career at FBK Kaunas in 1997, scoring 13 goals in 105 appearances, before moving to Russia in 2001 where he played for FC Torpedo-ZIL. He only made ten appearances for the club and later that year he moved to Latvian club Skonto FC where he stayed until 2004, making 79 appearances and scoring eight goals. In 2004, together with his manager Aleksandrs Starkovs, he moved once again to Russia, this time to play for Spartak Moscow where he played until 2009. After unsuccessful spell with FC Salyut Belgorod in 2010, in February 2011 Dedura returned to Lithuania and signed a two-year deal with FK Ekranas. In both of those seasons Deduras was a regular player in the team, as well as winning the league in both of those years. At the end of his second season he didn't extend his contract due to the club having financial issues and not being able to pay the wages. In winter 2013 Dedura joined very young I lyga, which was a 2nd tier of Lithuanian football pyramid, side FK Kauno Žalgiris.  After being revealed, the defender expressed his desire to become a coach one day, as he was also instantly promoted to being a captain and a playing coach.

International career
Dedura has played for the Lithuania national football team.

References

External links

Spartak Moscow profile

1978 births
Living people
Lithuanian footballers
Lithuanian expatriate footballers
Lithuania international footballers
FBK Kaunas footballers
FK Ekranas players
FK Kauno Žalgiris players
FC Moscow players
Skonto FC players
FC Spartak Moscow players
FC Salyut Belgorod players
A Lyga players
Russian Premier League players
Latvian Higher League players
Expatriate footballers in Russia
Lithuanian expatriate sportspeople in Russia
Expatriate footballers in Latvia
Lithuanian expatriate sportspeople in Latvia
Association football defenders